The 1951 Masters Tournament was the 15th Masters Tournament, held April 5–8 at Augusta National Golf Club in Augusta, Georgia. Ben Hogan, age 38, won the first of his two Masters titles, two strokes ahead of runner-up Skee Riegel. It was the fifth of his nine major titles.

After three rounds, Hogan was one stroke out of the lead, behind Riegel and Sam Snead, the 1949 champion. Hogan shot a bogey-free final round of 68 (−4), while Riegel carded a 71 and Snead an 80 (+8).  Prior to this victory, Hogan had eight top ten finishes at the Masters, twice as runner-up in 1942 and 1946.

The reigning U.S. Open champion, Hogan also won the year's next major, the 1951 U.S. Open.

With high attendance of about 15,000 on Sunday, a fifty percent bonus for the prize money was declared, boosting the purse to $15,000 and the winner's share to $3,000.

Field
1. Masters champions
Jimmy Demaret (9,10,12), Claude Harmon, Herman Keiser (9), Byron Nelson (2,6,9), Gene Sarazen (2,4,6,9), Horton Smith (9), Sam Snead (4,6,9,10)
Ralph Guldahl (2), Henry Picard (6,9,10,12) and Craig Wood (2) did not play.

2. U.S. Open champions
Johnny Farrell, Ben Hogan (6,9,10), Lawson Little (3,5,9), Lloyd Mangrum (9,10,12), Fred McLeod, Cary Middlecoff (9,10), Lew Worsham

3. U.S. Amateur champions
Dick Chapman (8,a), Charles Coe (8,a), Skee Riegel (9,10), Sam Urzetta (8,11,a), George Von Elm

4. British Open champions
Denny Shute (6)

5. British Amateur champions
Frank Stranahan (8,9,11,a), Robert Sweeny Jr. (a)

6. PGA champions
Jim Ferrier (9,10), Vic Ghezzi (9), Chandler Harper (12), Johnny Revolta

7. Members of the U.S. 1951 Ryder Cup team
Team not selected in time for inclusion.

8. Members of the U.S. 1951 Walker Cup team
William C. Campbell (a), Dow Finsterwald, Bill Goodloe (a), Bobby Knowles (11,a), Jim McHale Jr. (a), Harold Paddock Jr. (a), Harvie Ward (a)

Willie Turnesa (a) did not play. Finsterwald, Goodloe and Ward were reserves for the team.

9. Top 24 players and ties from the 1950 Masters Tournament
George Fazio (10), Leland Gibson, Fred Haas (10), Chick Harbert, Clayton Heafner, Joe Kirkwood Jr. (10), Johnny Palmer (10,12), Toney Penna

Skip Alexander (10) did not play.

10. Top 24 players and ties from the 1950 U.S. Open
Al Besselink, Julius Boros, Johnny Bulla, Marty Furgol, Dutch Harrison, Dick Mayer, Bill Nary, Henry Ransom, Bob Toski, Harold Williams

Dick Metz did not play.

11. 1950 U.S. Amateur quarter-finalists
Bill Shields (a), Tom Veech (a), John Ward (a)

Bud Holscher (a) and Dick Kinchla (a) did not play.

12. 1950 PGA Championship quarter-finalists
Dave Douglas, Ray Gafford, Henry Williams Jr.

13. One amateur, not already qualified, selected by a ballot of ex-U.S. Amateur champions
Johnny Dawson (a) was selected but did not play.

14. One professional, not already qualified, selected by a ballot of ex-U.S. Open champions
Jack Burke Jr.

15. Two players, not already qualified, with the best scoring average in the winter part of the 1951 PGA Tour
Ed Furgol, Ted Kroll

16. Foreign invitations
Roberto De Vicenzo (9), Tony Holguin, Bill Mawhinney, Juan Segura (a)

Numbers in brackets indicate categories that the player would have qualified under had they been American.

Round summaries

First round
Thursday, April 5, 1951

Source:

Second round
Friday, April 6, 1951

Source:

Third round
Saturday, April 7, 1951

Source:

Final round
Sunday, April 8, 1951

Final leaderboard

Sources:

Scorecard

Cumulative tournament scores, relative to par

Source:

References

External links
Masters.com – past winners and results
Augusta.com – 1951 Masters leaderboard and scorecards

1951
1951 in golf
1951 in American sports
1951 in sports in Georgia (U.S. state)
April 1951 sports events in the United States